Ander Garitano Urkizu (born 26 February 1969) is a Spanish retired professional football left midfielder and manager.

His career as a player – spent almost entirely in La Liga – was solely associated with two clubs, Athletic Bilbao and Zaragoza.

Playing career
Born in Derio, Biscay, Garitano began his professional career at local powerhouse Athletic Bilbao. After appearing twice in the closing stages of 1987–88 he quickly imposed himself as a first-choice player with good free kick skills, scoring 35 La Liga goals over nine seasons; on 12 March 1988, two weeks after his 19th birthday, he made his official debut, starting in a 5–0 away loss against Real Madrid.

Garitano signed for Real Zaragoza in 1996, and played there until his retirement in six years later. He was still regularly used in the Aragonese side's victorious run in the 2000–01 Copa del Rey, and finally retired the following summer at 33 – Zaragoza suffered top-flight relegation – with more than 500 competitive matches to his credit; from 1986 to 1988 he played 61 games for Athletic Bilbao B, with that team in the Segunda División.

Coaching career
Subsequently, Garitano moved into coaching, first taking charge of Zaragoza's youth teams. In mid-January 2008 he replaced the dismissed Víctor Fernández, first appearing in a Spanish Cup round-of-16 tie against Racing de Santander, a 4–2 loss (5–3 on aggregate).

Just two days after his only league game, a 3–1 home win over Real Murcia, Garitano quit the job, quoting a lack of commitment. The club would have a further two managers until the end of the campaign, which ended in relegation.

Garitano returned to Zaragoza for 2008–09, now as a youth coach. However, in late 2009, he moved to the reserves following José Aurelio Gay's promotion to the main squad.

Personal life
Garitano was the younger brother of Angel Garitano (also known as 'Ondarru') who served for many years as assistant to Mané at managerial appointments including Deportivo Alavés and Athletic Bilbao, and the uncle of another footballer (and midfielder), Gaizka Garitano whom, after unsuccessfully graduating from Athletic's academy, went on to represent, among others, neighbours SD Eibar, Real Sociedad and Alavés. They were distantly related to Juan Urquizu who also served Athletic as player and manager. However, the Basque player and manager Asier Garitano is no relation.

Club statistics

Honours
Zaragoza
Copa del Rey: 2000–01

References

External links

1969 births
Living people
People from Greater Bilbao
Sportspeople from Biscay
Spanish footballers
Footballers from the Basque Country (autonomous community)
Association football midfielders
La Liga players
Segunda División players
Segunda División B players
Bilbao Athletic footballers
Athletic Bilbao footballers
Real Zaragoza players
Spain youth international footballers
Spain under-21 international footballers
Basque Country international footballers
Spanish football managers
La Liga managers
Tercera División managers
Real Zaragoza managers